The 1979 Gulf British League season was the 45th season of the top tier of speedway in the United Kingdom and the 15th season known as the British League.

Summary
The league was sponsored by Gulf Oil for a fifth season. It comprised 18 teams - one fewer than the previous season. White City Rebels had folded and their riders became Eastbourne Eagles assets as Eastbourne were promoted from the National League. Bristol Bulldogs also dropped out after only two seasons back in the top flight. 

Coventry Bees won the league for the second year running. Hull Vikings' second place was their best ever finish. The Coventry Bees team was similar to the previous season with a young 18 year-old Danish newcomer Tommy Knudsen replacing Jiří Štancl from the previous season. Alan Molyneux once again backed up the Coventry overseas contingent with a solid average. Cradley Heath won the Knockout Cup mainly thanks to their USA superstar Bruce Penhall. The Cradley team also had their own young Danish newcomer in 20 year-old Erik Gundersen and 20 year-old Hans Nielsen posted a 10 plus average for the season riding for Wolves. The future looked extremely bright for Denmark.

During the new British League Fours tournament a horrific accident took place at Hackney Wick Stadium on Friday 8 June. In the final heat between Hackney and Eastbourne all four riders were competing when Hackney's Vic Harding and Eastbourne's Steve Weatherley touched and their bikes became locked together. They were both thrown from their bikes into the fence and the metal post supporting one of the track lights. Both riders were taken to hospital but Harding died later that night and Weatherley was left paralysed. Further bad news filtered though in December after the season had finished, when Poole Pirate's Christer Sjösten died following serious injuries sustained in a race in Australia.

Final table
M = Matches; W = Wins; D = Draws; L = Losses; Pts = Total Points

British League Knockout Cup
The 1979 Speedway Star British League Knockout Cup was the 41st edition of the Knockout Cup for tier one teams. Cradley Heath were the winners.

First round

Second round

Quarter-finals

Semi-finals

Final

First leg

Second leg

Cradley Heath were declared Knockout Cup Champions, winning on aggregate 120-96.

Final leading avergaes
The top ten averages recorded at the end of the season.

Riders & final averages
Belle Vue

 9.76
 9.06
 7.60
 6.00
 5.56
 5.17
 4.81
 4.25
 4.21
 3.08
 0.86

Birmingham

 9.15 
 7.91
 7.60
 6.14
 5.90
 5.05
 5.05
 4.33
 2.72

Coventry

 9.92
 9.13
 8.00
 6.62
 6.41
 5.93
 5.73
 4.95

Cradley Heath

 9.88
 8.34
 7.85
 7.83 
 7.71
 7.54
 7.35
 6.84
 4.77
 4.76

Eastbourne

 9.91 
 8.76 
 6.98
 5.59
 5.09
 4.27
 3.91
 3.75
 3.41
 3.09
 2.96

Exeter

 10.83
 8.49
 6.94
 6.47
 6.40
 6.17
 6.06
 6.05

Hackney

 7.78
 7.74
 7.70
 5.09
 4.33
 4.00
 3.80
 3.63

Halifax

 8.95
 8.13
 7.59
 6.93
 6.87
 5.18
 4.84
 4.24

Hull

 10.38 
 8.62
 8.47 
 8.40 
 7.46
 6.75 
 6.01

Ipswich

 9.32 
 9.21 
 7.51
 7.43
 7.33
 6.43
 4.95
 4.45
 4.00
 3.76
 3.41
 3.27
 2.10

King's Lynn

 10.21
 9.72 
 8.58
 5.98
 5.24
 5.00
 4.97
 4.26
 3.87
 2.27

Leicester

 8.47
 6.28
 5.99
 5.88
 5.40
 4.75
 4.14
 3.49
 3.47

Poole

 9.04
 8.58 
 6.49
 6.48 
 6.06
 5.82
 4.33
K 2.57

Reading

 10.32
 8.64
 7.75
 6.31
 5.65
 5.23
 5.16
 5.12
 3.75

Sheffield

 8.74
 7.57
 6.47
 6.03
 4.92
 4.84
 4.52
 4.37
 4.17
 3.61
 3.33

Swindon

 10.34 
 7.65
 6.98
 6.30
 6.06
 5.92
 4.66
 3.52

Wimbledon

 9.26
 8.97
 7.89
 7.38
 6.91
 5.47
 5.39
 4.35
 1.86
 1.38

Wolverhampton

 10.29 
 7.93
 6.81
 6.73
 6.39
 5.84
 5.44
 5.23
 3.52

See also
List of United Kingdom Speedway League Champions
Knockout Cup (speedway)

References

British League
League
British League